Helena Stetkiewicz or Olena Vyhovska (died 1664), was a second wife of Ivan Vyhovsky, Hetman of Zaporizhian Host (year 1657-1659) in Cossack Hetmanate.

Life
Helena Stetkiewicz was a daughter of Bohdan Stetkiewicz, Litvin castellan of Nowogródek (Navahrudak) and Mścisław (Mstsislaw). Her mother Helena Sołomierecka was a Ruthenian Duchess (Knjazna) of Rurikid stock tracing her heritage to the Grand Duchy of Smolensk.

After its marriage, the couple lived in Subotiv and Kiev. 

She was an influential figure among the Ukrainian Cossacks. She is known to have participated in politics as the adviser and collaborator of her spouse during his reign, but she was not popular among the Cossacks because she banned the drinking parties which had been so popular among the cossacks.

After a murder of Ivan Vyhovsky, Helena moved to a town of Ruda in Ruthenian Voivodeship (today a village in Lviv Oblast) where she reburied her husband and soon died as well. However, there is version that the couple is buried in the Manyava Skete in Carpathian Mountains.

Gallery

References

Further reading
 Руїна: друга половина XVII ст. / Упоряд. і передмова О. І. Гуржія; Ред. кол. В. А. Смолій (голова) та ін. — К.: Україна, 1996. — 431 с. — С. 312. — .
 Kovalevska, Olha. Hetmanesses. The Ukrainian Week. 24 December 2010.
 Руїна: друга половина XVII ст. / Упоряд. і передмова О. І. Гуржія; Ред. кол. В. А. Смолій (голова) та ін. — К.: Україна, 1996. — 431 с. — С. 312. — .
 Мицик Ю. Іван Виговський // Володарі гетьманської булави: Історичні портрети / Автор передмови В. А. Смолій. — К.: Варта, 1994. — 560 с. — С. 191—236. — .
 Дружини гетьмана Виговського
  ДРУЖИНИ ГЕТЬМАНІВ УКРАЇНИ: ЗАБУТІ ДОЛІ
  Гетьманші

1664 deaths
17th-century Belarusian people
People from the Cossack Hetmanate
17th-century Ukrainian people